Dol–Suha is a settlement north of Rečica ob Savinji in Slovenia. It is made up of two smaller settlements, Dol and Suha, hence the hyphenated name. The area belongs to the traditional region of Styria and is now included in the Savinja Statistical Region.

References

External links
Dol–Suha on Geopedia

Populated places in the Municipality of Rečica ob Savinji